The Kliese Housebarn, also known as the Langhoff Housebarn, is a historic Housebarn located in Emmet, Wisconsin. It was added to the National Register of Historic Places in 2008.

Architecture
This house is a traditional housebarn of the German half-timbered style. One side of the building was used as a barn, while the other side was used for human habitation. It was also used to store and process crops. The house also contained a traditional German schwarz küche that was used to smoke and cure meat.

References

Houses in Dodge County, Wisconsin
Houses completed in 1850
Houses on the National Register of Historic Places in Wisconsin
National Register of Historic Places in Dodge County, Wisconsin